Zhengdian may refer to:

Zhengdian (book), a 742 Chinese political treatise written by Liu Zhi
Zhengdian, Shandong, a town in Laoling, Shandong, China
Zhengdian Subdistrict, a subdistrict in Jiangxia District, Wuhan, Hubei, China